Aische Pervers (born 22 April 1986) is a German pornographic actress, presenter, singer and actress.

Biography
Born in Kleve, West Germany, Pervers began her production of self-made porn films during her studies in the German language and theology in 2006. Compared to the Berliner Kurier, she justified this step with financial reasons. After finishing her studies, she concentrated on her video productions. In the following year, Pervers began to regularly use current events for her video productions. She was the first amateur actress to shoot a porn at the Munich Oktoberfest.

She has been featured in some reports since 2010, had moderation jobs in the erotic programmes of Bluyoo.tv and Sport1, and roles in soap operas. In 2011, she got a leading role in the RTL II series X-Diaries. She appeared as a contestant in Das Supertalent on RTL, with more than seven million television viewers. Dressed as a teacher, she groaned the Erlkönig of Johann Wolfgang von Goethe and stripped to it. The tabloid newspaper  Bild recorded this and referred to the performance as "porn poetry".

In 2012, she stood again for the fourth season of X-Diaries before the camera. As of January 2012, she has already filmed more than 400 porn films. In February 2012, she shot with the Berlin Film Festival as a setting of the porn film Anale Berlinale. In May 2012, she was again with the self-written song Disco Porno at the casting for Das Supertalent, even if the performance despite the recording was not aired. So the song had its premiere as a music video at Bild Online on 14 December 2012.

In May 2013, Pervers participated in an episode of Frauentausch. In 2013, she was part of Das Supertalent for the third time. At the end of 2013, she began working as a DJ and singer under the name Miss Aische.

She lived with her husband, the porn-starring Manuel Stallion, in Berlin. In 2014, the couple married in Las Vegas and were accompanied by Exklusiv - Die Reportage for RTL II. In February 2017, the couple announced their separation.

At the beginning of 2016, Pervers took part in the casting of Deutschland sucht den Superstar, where she presented her new song Café Latte. She was accompanied by Micaela Schäfer. She also presented the song in the finale of DSDS on 7 May 2016, and the finale of Germany's Next Topmodel, which took place on 12 May 2016, in the Plaça de toros de Palma, the bullring arena of Palma, used Pervers for another porno show.

Awards

Television (selection)

Discography

References

External links

  – official website 
  – Fansite and Infoblog 
  – Artists website for Djane Miss Aische

Das Supertalent participants
German film actresses
German pornographic film actresses
1986 births
Deutschland sucht den Superstar participants
Living people
21st-century German  women singers
People from Kleve